The 1966 Arizona gubernatorial election took place on November 8, 1966. Incumbent governor Samuel Pearson Goddard ran for reelection to a second term as governor, narrowly winning the Democratic Party nomination as he was challenged by Justice of the Peace Norman Green.

Goddard went on to lose the general election to former mayor of Phoenix Jack Williams. Williams was sworn into his first term as governor on January 2, 1967.

Democratic primary

Candidates
 Samuel P. Goddard, incumbent governor
 Norman Green, Justice of the Peace
 Andrew J. Gilbert

Results

Republican primary

Candidates
 Jack Williams, former Mayor of Phoenix
 John Haugh, Speaker of the Arizona House of Representatives
 Robert W. Pickrell Attorney General of Arizona

Results

General election

Results

References

1966
1966 United States gubernatorial elections
Gubernatorial
November 1966 events in the United States